Backnang station is located on the Waiblingen–Schwäbisch Hall railway and is the starting point of the Backnang–Ludwigsburg railway in the city of Backnang in the German state of Baden-Württemberg. It is served by Regional-Express services. It is the terminus of lines S 3 and S 4 of the S-Bahn. It is classified by Deutsche Bahn as a category 3 station.

History
In the 1860s, the citizens of the Oberamt (district) of Backnang sought a connection to the rail network. In 1863, the Backnang trade association, together with trade associations in other towns, wrote a petition to the Württemberg ministry of foreign affairs, which was then in charge of railway construction. By the autumn engineers had travelled to the area to make surveys.

State Railways and Deutsche Reichsbahn periods 

On 26 October 1876, the Royal Württemberg State Railways opened the Murr Valley Railway between Waiblingen and Backnang. The station is located on a slope above the old town and a temporary entrance building was built. In 1877, work began on the permanent station building, made of sandstone and brick. On 18 October 1877, a restaurant was opened in the partially completed building. The temporary building was demolished in November 1877. The new station building was inaugurated along with the opening of the Backnang–Murrhardt section on 18 April 1878. It was a long two and a half storeys high central block with two three-story wings, which were covered with a hipped roof. The ground floor was made of sandstone. The doors and windows were built with round arches. The upper floors were made of brick, with the lintels and cornices built of sandstone as a contrast.

Since 1873, it had been clear that a branch line from the Murr Railway to the Northern Railway was necessary to relieve the railway junction at Stuttgart. This project was realised when the State Railway opened the Backnang–Bietigheim railway on 8 December 1879. This line branches off from the southern end of the station and descends from there into the Murr valley.

The town council built the Hexenstäffele, a new footpath from Kalten Wasser (now called Eduard Breuninger-Straße) to the station, which was opened on 19 July 1879. The original route was altered in 1928. On 12 September 1888, Dillensiusstraße was renamed Untere Bahnhofstraße (“lower station street”, called Bahnhofstraße since 1929) and Güterbahnhofstraße ("freight yard street") was renamed Obere Bahnhofstraße (“upper station street”).

During the Second World War, Backnang was the target of several air raids. A fighter-bomber attack on 22 February 1944 damaged 59 buildings, including the station building.

Deutsche Bundesbahn and Deutsche Bahn periods  
Deutsche Bundesbahn duplicated and electrified the Waiblingen–Backnang section from 1962 to 1965. Nevertheless, the locomotives of most trains were not changed in Backnang, which would have led to an extension of running times.

On 20 March 1973, demolition began of the nearly a century-old station building to make room for a new building. The new one-story building was opened on 20 August 1975.

Since the start of planning of an S-Bahn for Stuttgart and the surrounding area in the 1960s, a terminus at Backnang was planned. On 27 September 1981, S-Bahn line S 3 opened between Backnang and Schwabstraße.

On 31 May 1996, the lines to Marbach and Crailsheim were electrified. This ended diesel operation in Backnang. On 8 December 2012, the extension of the S-Bahn line S 4 between Marbach and Backnang was opened.

Rail operations 
The station is a railway junction where the Backnang–Ludwigsburg railway branches off the Waiblingen–Schwäbisch Hall railway. Platform track 1 is used mostly by trains on line 4 of the S-Bahn running towards Marbach. Trains towards Waiblingen stop on track 3.  Trains towards Schwäbisch Hall-Hessental stop on track 4. Line S 3 S-Bahn services towards Waiblingen start on track 5. It is classified by Deutsche Bahn as a category 3 station.

Regional Transport

S-Bahn

References

Railway stations in Baden-Württemberg
Backnang
Railway stations in Germany opened in 1876
Buildings and structures in Rems-Murr-Kreis